IC 3 is a compact elliptical galaxy located approximately 228 million light-years away in the constellation of Pisces. The galaxy was discovered by astronomer Stéphane Javelle on August 27, 1892.

See also
 IC 1101
 List of galaxies
 Messier 87
 Index Catalogue

References

Elliptical galaxies
Pisces (constellation)
0003
836